This list provides the list of various educational institutions in city of Rajbiraj, Saptari District, Nepal.

Rajbiraj is home to several educational institutions for pre-primary, primary, secondary, high-secondary, senior-secondary, graduate and post-graduate studies. Rajbiraj is an educational hub of Eastern Region of Nepal. The important point to note in the list is significant rise of Nursing colleges & +2 colleges in the city which attracts the student from neighbour district & Eastern region of Nepal.

Purbanchal University affiliated College
 Caliber International College
 Laxmi Ballav Narsingh Bahumukhi Campus, Rajbiraj
 Saptarishi Health Science College, Rajbiraj
 Saptarishi Multiple Science College, Rajbiraj
 Unique Educational Academy Pvt. Ltd., Rajbiraj

Tribhuvan University affiliated College
 Mahendra Bindeshwori Multiple Campus, Rajbiraj 
 World Vision Modern Campus, Rajbiraj with B.Ed. & B.B.S.
 Engineering College (under-construction) in the premises of Ma Bi Bi Campus

Technical Institution & CTEVT Affiliated colleges
 Chinnamasta institute of technology
 College of Software and Engineering College
 Jagadamba Technical Institute
 Nepal Softech College Of Computer Engineering
 Rajdevi Technical Institute
 Udayapur Technical Training School

Medical Colleges
 Sai Krishna Medical College & Hospital (SKMCH)
 Unique College Of Medical Science & Hospital Pvt. Ltd.
 Ram Raja Prasad Singh Academy of Health Sciences (under construction)

Nursing Colleges
 Chinnamasta Nursing College
 Jagadamba Medical institute
 Sai Krishna Nursing College
 Unique College Of Medical Science & Hospital Pvt. Ltd.
 Ramraja Prasad Singh Nursing College : It is inside the zonal hospital premises which is under-construction.

+2 Colleges with Graduation
 Caliber International College
 Happyland Higher Secondary School
 Chinnamasta Higher Secondary School
 Kshitiz Education Foundation
 Mission Higher Secondary School
 Oxford International College
 Laliguraans Higher Secondary School
 Rajbiraj Model Higher Secondary
 Janaki Higher Secondary School
 Rajdevi Thakodevi Jogendra Bhagat Uchha Madhyamik Vidhyalaya
 Public Bindeshwori Uchha Madhyamik Vidhyalaya
 World Vision Modern Secondary School& Campus

Schools 
Happyland secondary school
Janki higher secondary school
 Little Flower Secondary School
 Premier Secondary Boarding School
 little angels modern secondary school
 Durga Secondary School
 Global English Boarding School
 Green boarding secondary school
 Green secondary school
 Kankalini Academy Rupani Road Rajbiraj
 Kesho anirodha Ma.Bi.
 Laxmi English Boarding School Rajbiraj-5. Saptari
 Maa Sarawati English School
 Manokamna Higher S. School
 New Rose Public English School
 New Sunlight English School
 New sunshine english academy diman-4 saptari
 Peace Zone Model School
 Rajdevi Secondary School
 Saptarsihi Educational Academy
 Shanti Niketan Educational Academy
 Shiva International Boarding Secondary School
 Universal Academy
 World Vision Modern Sec. School & Campus

References

Saptari District